Agneta Stark (born 9 February 1946), is the vice chancellor of Dalarna University in Sweden and was the president of the International Association for Feminist Economics (IAFFE) from 2012 to 2013. She is also the vice chair of the Association of Swedish Higher Education.

The main areas of research that she covers are economic theory, accounting theory, and also, gender and economic change.

Education 
Stark gained her economics degree from the Stockholm School of Economics, her LL. M. and her doctorate in business administration were from Stockholm University.

Honours 
In 2004 Karlstad University awarded Agneta Stark an honorary doctorate.

Selected publications 
  In Swedish as:

See also 
 Feminist economics
 List of feminist economists

References 

1946 births
Feminist economists
Living people
Macroeconomists
Stockholm School of Economics alumni
Stockholm University alumni
21st-century Swedish economists
Swedish women economists
Place of birth missing (living people)
Swedish women academics
Rectors of universities and colleges in Sweden
Women heads of universities and colleges
Presidents of the International Association for Feminist Economics